"She Never Lets It Go to Her Heart" is a song written by Chris Waters and Tom Shapiro, and recorded by American country music artist Tim McGraw. It was released in June 1996 as the fourth single from McGraw's All I Want album. The song reached Number One on the Billboard Hot Country Singles & Tracks (now Hot Country Songs) charts.

Single and album edits
The single edit to "She Never Lets It Go to Her Heart," released for retail sale and radio airplay, features an alternate vocal track by McGraw that is slightly different from the original album version. In addition, the backing vocals were remixed, eliminating the "stereo width" effect heard in the album version.

This was also Tim's first single to not have an accompanying music video.

Chart performance
"She Never Lets It Go to Her Heart" debuted at number 73 on the U.S. Billboard Hot Country Singles & Tracks for the week of June 22, 1996.

Year-end charts

References

1996 singles
1995 songs
Tim McGraw songs
Songs written by Tom Shapiro
Songs written by Chris Waters
Song recordings produced by Byron Gallimore
Song recordings produced by James Stroud
Curb Records singles